McCardie is a surname. Notable people with the surname include:

Brian McCardie (born 1965), Scottish actor and writer
Henry McCardie (1869–1933), English judge

See also
Claire Cardie, American computer scientist
McCurdie
McLardie